The Amargosa River pupfish (Cyprinodon nevadensis amargosae) is a member of a pupfish species complex which inhabits the watershed of ancient Lake Manly (present day Death Valley in California, USA).  Currently, the species inhabits two disjunct perennial reaches of the lower Amargosa River.  The upstream portion is near Tecopa and passes through the Amargosa Canyon.  The lower portion is northwest of Saratoga Springs, just at the head (southern inlet) of Death Valley, where the Amargosa River turns north to enter the valley.

These diminutive fish subsist on cyanobacteria and algae.  They have a life history adapted to the vagaries of the intermittent nature of their environment.  They have a very short generation time (<1 year and usually just a few months), which allows for rapid exploitation of flooded portions of the streambed in years of high flow.

References

Further reading
 

Taxa named by Robert Rush Miller
Fish described in 1889
Fauna of California
Subspecies